City of the Sun is an intentional community and census-designated place in Luna County, New Mexico, United States. Its population was 33 as of the 2020 census. The community, which is on the northern border of Columbus, was founded in 1972.

Like other areas in Luna County, the community is in the Deming Public Schools school district.

Demographics

References

1972 establishments in New Mexico
Census-designated places in New Mexico
Census-designated places in Luna County, New Mexico
Intentional communities in the United States
Populated places established in 1972